Ofentse Jeremiah Mokae is a South African politician who has been a Member of the Northern Cape Provincial Legislature since September 2019, representing the Democratic Alliance. Mokae was a councillor of the Sol Plaatje Local Municipality from 2016 to 2019.

Early life and education
Mokae was born in Galeshewe, Kimberley. He matriculated from Thabane High School and went to study at the Cape Peninsula University of Technology. He holds a national diploma in journalism and a B-tech degree. Mokae is currently studying towards a diploma in local government from the University of Fort Hare.

Political career
Mokae joined the Congress of South African Students and was elected as the local secretary for the organisation's student body in the Sol Plaatje sub-region in 2006. While at university, he was active in both the South African Student Congress and the Students' Christian Organisation. In 2011, he joined the Democratic Alliance.

Mokae returned to Kimberley in 2013. He was appointed as a field worker for the DA. The DA also appointed him as a provincial youth coordinator and as a researcher at the provincial legislature. In 2014, Mokae participated in US President Barack Obama's Young African Leaders Initiative. In 2016, he was elected as a proportional representation councillor of the Sol Plaatje Local Municipality. At the age of 29, he was the youngest member of the DA's caucus.

In September 2019, the DA selected him to fill Allen Grootboom's seat in the Northern Cape Provincial Legislature. He was sworn in on 11 September 2019.

Personal life
Mokae is an LGBT-activist.

References

External links
Mr Ofentse Mokae at Northern Cape Provincial Legislature

Living people
Year of birth missing (living people)
People from Kimberley, Northern Cape
Members of the Northern Cape Provincial Legislature
Democratic Alliance (South Africa) politicians
21st-century South African politicians